Man Maw may refer to several places in Burma (Myanmar):

 Man Maw, Bhamo - a city and former Shan principality (also called Wanmaw) in Bhamo Township, Kachin State
 Man Maw (24°52"N 94°58"E) - Homalin Township, Sagaing Region
 Man Maw (24°49"N 94°51"E)  - Homalin Township, Sagaing Region
 Manmaw, Homalin  - Homalin Township, Sagaing Region